Old First Presbyterian Church is a historic church at the junction of Huntington and Washington Streets in Kosciusko, Mississippi and was founded in 1844. It is a member of the Mississippi Valley Presbytery of the Presbyterian Church in America. The current pastor is Rev. Philip Palmertree.

The church building is located at 603 Smythe Street at the corner of Smythe Street and Calvary street, and was built in 1899 and added to the National Register in 1992.

External links 
 Official website

References

Churches on the National Register of Historic Places in Mississippi
Romanesque Revival church buildings in Mississippi
Churches completed in 1899
19th-century Presbyterian church buildings in the United States
Presbyterian Church in America churches in Mississippi
National Register of Historic Places in Attala County, Mississippi
Kosciusko, Mississippi